St. Gregory's Academy is an all-male Roman Catholic boarding school in Elmhurst, Pennsylvania. It promised a threefold education: spiritual, intellectual, and physical. Students participated in traditional Roman Catholic liturgy, were provided with intellectual formation based on the Integrated Humanities Program, and competed in high-school level soccer and rugby. Students participating on those teams won a Pennsylvania Rugby State Championship, and Patrick Audino was named a USA Eagle Rugby Player. 

The purpose of St. Gregory's Academy was taken from Pope Pius XI's Divini Illius Magistri:

"The specific and immediate purpose of Christian education is to cooperate with divine grace in forming the true and perfect Christian… the true Christian, the product of Christian education, is simply the supernatural man: the man who feels, judges and acts always and consistently in accordance with right reason enlightened by the example and teaching of Jesus Christ."

References
Schools in Lackawanna County, Pennsylvania
Defunct schools in Pennsylvania